Slow train may refer to a regional rail service calling at all stations along the route.

Slow Train may also refer to:

"Slow Train" (Flanders and Swann song), 1963
"Slow Train" (Bob Dylan song), 1980
"Slow Train", a 1974 song by Status Quo from their album Quo
"The Slow Train", a 2005 song by Lemon Jelly from their album '64–'95